Friedrich Thurau (1843–1913) was a German entomologist.

He specialised in butterflies. His collection of Palearctic lepidoptera is in Museum für Naturkunde in Berlin.

Works
partial list
Colias nastes Bsd. var. werdandi Zett. und ihre Aberratione. Berl. ent. Z. 48, pp. [113-116]
Neue Rhopaloceren aus Ost Afrika. Ergebnisse der Nyassa-See-un Kenya-Gebirgs-Expedition der Hermann und Elise geb. Heckmann-Wentzel-Stiftung Berl. ent. Z. 48 : 117-143 (1903).
Neue Lepidopteren aus Ost- und Central-Afrika, im Königl. zoologischen Museum zu Berlin Berl. ent. Z. 48 : 301-314 (1903)
 Berl. ent. Z. online.

References
 Groll, E. K. (Hrsg.): Biografien der Entomologen der Welt : Datenbank. Version 4.15 : Senckenberg Deutsches Entomologisches Institut, 2010 

German lepidopterists
1843 births
1914 deaths